Portland is a borough in Northampton County, Pennsylvania. The population of Portland was 494 at the 2020 census. Portland is part of the Lehigh Valley metropolitan area, which had a population of 861,899 and was thus the 68th most populous metropolitan area in the U.S. as of the 2020 census.

Geography
Portland is located at  (40.920622, -75.097738).

Transportation

Pennsylvania Route 611 is the only numbered highway serving Portland. It follows Delaware Drive along a north-south alignment through the heart of the borough. The Portland–Columbia Toll Bridge crosses the Delaware River in Portland, connecting the borough to U.S. Route 46, New Jersey Route 94 and Interstate 80 in New Jersey.

History

19th century
Portland's first major business was logging. It also had several taverns and hotels. Records show that the Hibblertown Hotel, which is the present-day Ackerson house on State Street, the Dill's Tavern, which was later torn down, and the What Cheer Inn, which is present-day Duckloe Showroom at the corner of Delaware Avenue and Main Street, all prospered because of loggers.

The railroad was a vital force in the development of Portland. It changed the mode of transporting goods, and attracted many new residents. As a result of increased population, the business community expanded to serve the needs of the village. By the time of the incorporation there were three general stores, a hardware store, a drug store, four confectionery shops, two millinery shops, and jewelry store.

The population of the Portland community has remained stable during most of the past one hundred years. Since the business community exists essentially to serve the townspeople, it too has remained constant. However, it has kept pace with the changing times. The number of businesses has not varied, but the types have changed to keep pace with modern times. Virtually all the businesses are owned by people who live in Portland or nearby communities, therefore these businesspeople not only have a sense of pride in their own stores, but in the community as well.

The Delaware River provided easy transport. At first only the Indians skimmed their canoes over its surface, but by the mid-18th century, rafts were in use during spring floods. As late as 1870, the river near Portland would be full of rafts as far was the eye could see. Rafting started to wane in the 1880s because railroads had reached the lumbering country. The Portland Covered Bridge had its beginnings as early as February 5, 1816. Records indicate that Francis Myerhoff, owner of the Columbia Glass Works, received a charter from the State of New Jersey to build a bridge across the river to help in the delivery of the sand he needed for his factory in New Jersey. In January 1869, the bridge was finally completed by the Charles, Kellogg and Maurice Company of Athens, Pennsylvania, which was later renamed the Union Bridge Company. According to an Easton paper of January 19, 1869, Mrs. Sophia Sandt rode from Pennsylvania to New Jersey and back again in her sleigh "amidst the applause of the people." The bridge, of the Burr Truss type, was 775 feet long, 18 feet wide, and cost about $40,000 to construct.

Portland had a newspaper, The Portland Enterprise. This weekly paper, started in 1847 by L.G. Raymond, gave the people on both sides of the river all the news. Coe Finch took over the paper in the 1880s and continued until John Wildrick became editor in 1900. The financial center of Portland and vicinity was the Portland National Bank. It was organized on February 7, 1903, and received its charter as a federal bank on March 11, 1903. It served the Portland area continuously except for a period during 1932 when it closed its doors under the pressure of the Great Depression.

20th and 21st centuries
The Great Flood of August 19, 1955 was too much for the span. Early in the afternoon of that Friday, the center of the bridge gave way to the relentless pounding of the highest water ever recorded on the Delaware River, and all but the section closest to the New Jersey side floated down the river. Thus came to an end what was at the time the longest covered wooden bridge in the United States, and the last one spanning the Delaware River.

County Bridge No. 36 in Portland was added to the National Register of Historic Places in 1988.

Demographics

As of the census of 2000, there were 579 people, 236 households, and 152 families residing in the borough. The population density was 1,117.7 people per square mile (429.9/km2). There were 247 housing units at an average density of 476.8 per square mile (183.4/km2). The racial makeup of the borough was 98.27% White, 0.86% Asian, 0.17% from other races, and 0.69% from two or more races. Hispanic or Latino of any race were 4.15% of the population.

There were 236 households, out of which 28.8% had children under the age of 18 living with them, 48.7% were married couples living together, 9.3% had a female householder with no husband present, and 35.2% were non-families. 27.5% of all households were made up of individuals, and 10.6% had someone living alone who was 65 years of age or older. The average household size was 2.45 and the average family size was 2.99.

In the borough, the population was spread out, with 22.8% under the age of 18, 5.2% from 18 to 24, 32.1% from 25 to 44, 24.7% from 45 to 64, and 15.2% who were 65 years of age or older. The median age was 39 years. For every 100 females there were 98.3 males. For every 100 females age 18 and over, there were 99.6 males. The median income for a household in the borough was $36,827, and the median income for a family was $46,250. Males had a median income of $35,417 versus $21,875 for females. The per capita income for the borough was $17,275. About 4.1% of families and 6.0% of the population were below the poverty line, including 0.7% of those under age 18 and 4.2% of those age 65 or over.

Public education
The borough is served by the Bangor Area School District. Students in grades nine through 12 attend Bangor Area High School in Bangor.

References

Gallery

External links

1845 establishments in Pennsylvania
Boroughs in Northampton County, Pennsylvania
Boroughs in Pennsylvania
Populated places established in 1845